Amaury Armindo Bischoff (born 31 March 1987) is a professional footballer who plays for French club SR Colmar as a central midfielder. Born in France, he has represented both France and Portugal at youth level. 

After starting out at Werder Bremen, he went on to spend most of his career in Germany, mainly with Preußen Münster. He also had a one-year spell in England, with Arsenal.

Club career

Early years
Born in Colmar, Haut-Rhin to a French father – from Alsace – and a Portuguese mother, Bischoff began his football career at SR Colmar, finishing his development at Strasbourg. Aged 18, he moved to Germany and signed for Werder Bremen, going on to spend the majority of his spell with the reserve side but training with the main squad several times.

On 14 March 2007, Bischoff made his debut for Werder's first team, coming on as a substitute for Diego in the 74th minute of a 2–0 home win against Celta for that season's UEFA Cup (3–0 on aggregate). It would be his only official game for the club.

Arsenal
Bischoff left Werder Bremen on 1 July 2008, after rejecting a contract extension. Shortly after, he made a statement in which he said that his transfer to Arsenal was imminent; it was subsequently confirmed on 30 July, with manager Arsène Wenger stating he knew the signing was a "gamble on talent" due to the player's injury record.

Bischoff made his debut in an Arsenal shirt on 6 October 2008, in a reserve match against Stoke City, making his first appearance with the first team on 11 November in a 3–0 home victory over Wigan Athletic in the fourth round of the League Cup, coming on as a substitute in the 77th minute. He made two more in the domestic cups for the main squad, both as a substitute: the 2–0 League Cup loss at Burnley in December 2008, and the 4–0 defeat of Cardiff City in the FA Cup.
 
On 2 May 2009, Bischoff played his first and only game in the Premier League, replacing Theo Walcott in the 64th minute of the side's 3–0 away victory against Portsmouth. He was released by the Gunners when his contract expired on 30 June, having been unable to break into the first team.

Portugal
On 26 August 2009, Bischoff signed with Académica in Portugal, on a two-year deal. He made his Primeira Liga debut on 2 October in a 2–4 home defeat to Marítimo, starting and being replaced at half-time. It would be one of only four competitive appearances during the season, which he finished on loan to Segunda Liga side Aves.

On 30 June 2011, after declining all offers to renew his contract, Bischoff left Coimbra. He joined former club Aves shortly after, for two years.

Preußen Münster
Bischoff returned to Germany in summer 2012, going on to spend several seasons in the 3. Liga with Preußen Münster and eventually becoming captain. In 2012–13, he scored a career-best ten goals to help his team to the fourth position.

At the start of the 2016–17 campaign, Bischoff requested permission to be removed from the Preußenstadion-based squad, as his mind was not "in the game".

Hansa Rostock
On 21 January 2017, Bischoff signed a two-and-a-half-year deal with Hansa Rostock also in the German second division. In June 2019, it was announced he would leave the club after having chosen not to accept an offer of a contract extension.

Later career
Bischoff joined Bahlinger SC of the Regionalliga Südwest on 5 August 2019, on a two-year contract. He returned to France and Colmar 17 years after leaving in June 2021, aged 34.

International career
Bischoff started representing France at under-18 level. However, on 14 May 2007, he chose to play for Portugal.

On 10 February 2009, in his debut with the Portugal under-21s (ultimately his only appearance), Bischoff opened a 3–1 friendly win against Switzerland in the fourth minute.

Career statistics

References

External links

1987 births
Living people
French people of Portuguese descent
French people of German descent
Sportspeople from Colmar
Footballers from Alsace
Portuguese footballers
French footballers
Association football midfielders
Championnat National 3 players
SR Colmar players
RC Strasbourg Alsace players
3. Liga players
Regionalliga players
SV Werder Bremen II players
SV Werder Bremen players
SC Preußen Münster players
FC Hansa Rostock players
Bahlinger SC players
Premier League players
Arsenal F.C. players
Primeira Liga players
Liga Portugal 2 players
Associação Académica de Coimbra – O.A.F. players
C.D. Aves players
France youth international footballers
Portugal under-21 international footballers
Portuguese expatriate footballers
Expatriate footballers in Germany
Expatriate footballers in England
Portuguese expatriate sportspeople in Germany
Portuguese expatriate sportspeople in England